Kurt Attinger was a Swiss curler.

Teams

Private life
Attinger grew up in a family of curlers. His father Peter Sr. is a 1972 Swiss men's champion. His brothers - Peter Jr., Bernhard, Ruedi and Werner are curlers too. They won Swiss and European championships and Worlds medals when they played on Peter Jr.'s team. His nephew (Peter Jr.'s son) Felix is the skip of a team that won the Swiss men's silver in 2017 and bronze in 2016, with Peter Jr. coaching this team. Bernhard's daughter, Sandra Ramstein-Attinger is a competitive curler too. She played in three Women's Worlds with teams skipped by Silvana Tirinzoni and Binia Feltscher-Beeli.

Kurt Attinger died in 2011 of cancer.

References

External links
 

2011 deaths

Swiss male curlers
European curling champions
Swiss curling champions
Deaths from cancer in Switzerland